In molecular biology, a guanine tetrad (also known as a G-tetrad or G-quartet)  is a structure composed of four guanine bases in a square planar array. They most prominently contribute to the structure of G-quadruplexes, where their hydrogen bonding stabilizes the structure. Usually, there are at least two guanine tetrads in a G-quadruplex, and they often feature Hoogsteen-style hydrogen bonding.

Guanine tetrads are formed by sequences rich in guanine, such as GGGGC. They may also play a role in the dimerization of non-endogenous RNAs to facilitate the replication of some viruses. Guanine tetrads dimerize through their 5' ends since it is more energetically favorable.

They can be stabilized by central cations, such as lithium, sodium, potassium, rubidium, or cesium. However, they still form a variety of different structures. Guanine tetrads are not always stable, but the sugar-phosphate backbone of DNA can assist in stability of the guanine tetrads themselves. Guanine tetrads are more stable when stacked, as intermolecular forces between each layers help stabilize them.

Guanine tetrads can also influence recombination, replication, and transcription. For instance, guanine tetrads are found in the promoter region of the Myc family of oncogenes. They also function in immunoglobulin class switching and may play a role in the genome of HIV. Guanine tetrads appear frequently in the telomeric regions of DNA.

See also 
 G-quadruplex
 Hoogsteen base pair
 Heterochromatin
 Regulation of gene expression
 Guanine
 Telomere

References

External links 
 QGRS Mapper
 QuadBase2

Molecular biology
Molecular genetics
Cell biology
DNA
G-quadruplex